Camila Andrea Valbuena Roa (born February 18, 1997 in Bogotá) is a Colombian track and road cyclist. She has previous competed with UCI Women's Team  in 2017.

She won gold in the 2014 UCI Juniors Track World Championships in the points race category. She was the Pan American junior time trial champion, and qualified for the time trial at the 2015 UCI Road World Championships. In the 2017 Bolivarian Games, she won gold in the team pursuit and bronze in the individual pursuit.

Major results

2014
 1st  Points race, UCI Juniors Track World Championships
 1st  Time trial, Pan American Junior Road Championships
2015
 Pan American Junior Road Championships
1st  Time trial
2nd  Road race
 1st  Time trial, National Junior Road Championships
 8th Time trial, Pan American Games
2017
 Bolivarian Games
1st  Team pursuit
3rd  Individual pursuit
 6th Overall Vuelta a Colombia Femenina
2019
 National Under-23 Road Championships
2nd Road race
2nd Time trial
 2nd Overall Vuelta a Colombia Femenina
1st Young rider classification
 10th Overall Vuelta Femenina a Guatemala
2020
 3rd Time trial, National Road Championships
2021
 4th Overall Vuelta Femenina a Guatemala
 5th Overall Vuelta a Colombia Femenina 
2022
 3rd Time trial, National Road Championships

References

External links

1997 births
Colombian track cyclists
Colombian female cyclists
Living people
Sportspeople from Bogotá
20th-century Colombian women
21st-century Colombian women